Diasham Karreh (also Romanized as Dīāsham Karreh) is a village in Tut-e Nadeh Rural District, in the Central District of Dana County, Kohgiluyeh and Boyer-Ahmad Province, Iran. At the 2006 census, its population was 35, in 11 families.

References 

Populated places in Dana County